Martha Greenblatt is a chemist, researcher, and faculty member at Rutgers University, New Brunswick, New Jersey. As of January 2008 she was the only female chair of a science department in the School of Arts and Science. Greenblatt took the position of Chair of the Chemistry Department at Rutgers while pursuing research interests in solid state inorganic chemistry. She was also the recipient of the 2003 American Chemical Society’s Garvan-Olin Medal – a national award given yearly to an outstanding woman chemist. In 2004, she became Board of Governors Professor of Chemistry at Rutgers.

Early life 
Greenblatt was born in Debrecen, Hungary in 1941. During WW II her father escaped from a Nazi labor camp. Greenblatt, her mother, and 6 month-old brother were on a train to Auschwitz when it changed directions and they were saved. Greenblatt, her mother and brother lived in Vienna until the war ended. They returned to Hungary to their apartment, where they found Greenblatt's father. In October 1956, after attending gymnasium in Debrecen for one year and one month, Hungarians rebelled against the Soviet occupation. During the chaos of the revolt Greenblatt, who was not quite 16 years old at the time, escaped with two friends to Vienna, in December 1956. In January 1957 she arrived in New York City. She enrolled in New Utricht high school in Brooklyn, and then enrolled at Brooklyn College in fall, 1958.

Education 
In January 1962 she received a BSc (cum laude) in Chemistry from Brooklyn College. Greenblatt studied under Professor Herman Marks, taking his famous Introduction to Polymer course. Rudy Marcus was her chemical physics professor, who later received the Nobel Prize in Chemistry for work he did at Brooklyn Polytechnic Institute in the 1950s and 1960s. She earned her Ph.D from the Brooklyn Polytechnic Institute in 1967.

Career 
Her first job was as a chemist at the Chiclets Chewing Gum Company in Long Island City. From 1972-1973 she was a visiting scientist at the Weizmann Institute in Israel. In 1974 she joined the faculty at Rutgers University. In 1980 she spent a summer as visiting professor at the Clarendon Laboratory at Oxford University in England. She took a sabbatical year at Bell Laboratories in Murray Hill, New Jersey from 1980-1981.

Research 
Greenblatt's research is in the area of solid-state chemistry, specializing in the synthesis and characterization of quasi-low-dimensional transition metal compounds, fast ionic motion in solids, and high-temperature superconducting materials.

References

1941 births
People from Debrecen
Living people
21st-century American chemists
Rutgers University faculty
Recipients of the Garvan–Olin Medal
American women chemists
Hungarian women chemists
Polytechnic Institute of New York University alumni
New Utrecht High School alumni
Brooklyn College alumni
American women academics
21st-century American women scientists